Exploding Views is the third studio album by British indie rock musician SJ Esau. It was released on FromSCRATCH Records in 2014 on vinyl, CD, and digital format. "The Pull" features contributions from Doseone and Charlotte Nicholls. A DVD release of the album containing videos for each track has been announced for late 2014.

Critical reception

Phillip Allen of Louder Than War wrote, "this album will widen SJ Esau's audience and hopefully put him on the map next to fellow Bristol independent artists such as Olo Worms and Oliver Wilde and the truly inspiring homegrown talent that makes the place special." He called the album "a triumph of the independent spirit that the city of Bristol produces so much of."

Track listing

References

External links
 

2014 albums
SJ Esau albums
Experimental pop albums